Yuri Alekseyevich Nesterenko (born 12 June 1991) is a Russian professional football goalkeeper. He plays for Kuban Krasnodar.

Club career
He made his debut in the Russian Premier League on 30 March 2014 for FC Rubin Kazan in a game against FC Rostov.

Career statistics

Club

References

External links
 
 

1991 births
Sportspeople from Krasnodar
Living people
Russian footballers
Russia youth international footballers
Association football goalkeepers
FC Rubin Kazan players
FC Neftekhimik Nizhnekamsk players
FC Yenisey Krasnoyarsk players
FC Rotor Volgograd players
FC Akron Tolyatti players
FC Urozhay Krasnodar players
Russian Premier League players
Russian First League players
Russian Second League players